Ildikó Strehli (born 15 July 1965) is a Hungarian bobsledder. She competed in the two woman event at the 2002 Winter Olympics.

References

External links
 

1965 births
Living people
Hungarian female bobsledders
Olympic bobsledders of Hungary
Bobsledders at the 2002 Winter Olympics
Sportspeople from Komárom-Esztergom County